Marta Jeschke (born 2 June 1986 in Wejherowo) is a Polish sprinter who specializes in the 200 metres. Her personal best time is 23.19 seconds, achieved in June 2008 in Rostock. She has best of 11.33 seconds in the 100 metres, which she set in Kraków in 2011.

Jeschke represented Poland at the 2008 Summer Olympics in Beijing. In the 200 m she did not qualify from her heat.  She competed in the 4x100 metres relay together with Daria Korczyńska, Dorota Jędrusińska and Ewelina Klocek. In their first round heat they placed fifth behind Belgium, Great Britain, Brazil and Nigeria. Their time of 43.47 seconds was the second best non-directly qualifying time and the seventh time overall out of sixteen participating nations. With this result they qualified for the final in which they replaced Jeschke with Joanna Henryka Kocielnik. In the final they were eventually disqualified. She won the bronze medal with the Polish 4 x 100 metres relay at the 2010 European Athletics Championships.

She again represented Poland at the 2012 Summer Olympics, this time in the 100 m and the 4 x 100 metres.

Competition record

References

 

1986 births
Living people
Polish female sprinters
Athletes (track and field) at the 2008 Summer Olympics
Athletes (track and field) at the 2012 Summer Olympics
Olympic athletes of Poland
People from Wejherowo
European Athletics Championships medalists
Sportspeople from Pomeranian Voivodeship
Recipients of the Bronze Cross of Merit (Poland)
World Athletics Championships athletes for Poland
Universiade medalists in athletics (track and field)
Universiade silver medalists for Poland
Medalists at the 2009 Summer Universiade
Olympic female sprinters
21st-century Polish women